Nick Agallar (born January 13, 1979) is an American mixed martial artist. He competed in the lightweight division.

Mixed martial arts record

|-
| Win
| align=center| 24-6
| Morgan Sickinger
| Submission (armbar)
| Combat USA: Best 8 in the State 2
| 
| align=center| 1
| align=center| 3:04
| Green Bay, Wisconsin, United States
| 
|-
| Win
| align=center| 23-6
| Nick Dupees
| Submission (armbar)
| NAFC: Relentless
| 
| align=center| 1
| align=center| 3:58
| West Allis, Wisconsin, United States
| 
|-
| Win
| align=center| 22-6
| Brian Learn
| Submission (arm-triangle choke)
| RFN: Racine Fight Night 4
| 
| align=center| 1
| align=center| 1:11
| Racine, Wisconsin, United States
| 
|-
| Loss
| align=center| 21-6
| Jorge Masvidal
| TKO (punches)
| Bellator I
| 
| align=center| 1
| align=center| 1:19
| Hollywood, Florida, United States
| 
|-
| Win
| align=center| 21-5
| Shane McDonald
| TKO (injury)
| FCC 35: Freestyle Combat Challenge 35
| 
| align=center| 1
| align=center| N/A
| Racine, Wisconsin, United States
| 
|-
| Win
| align=center| 20-5
| Luke Nichols
| TKO (submission to strikes)
| FCC 33: Freestyle Combat Challenge 33
| 
| align=center| 1
| align=center| 0:55
| Kenosha, Wisconsin, United States
| 
|-
| Win
| align=center| 19-5
| Shinya Kumazawa
| TKO (punches)
| FCC 31: Freestyle Combat Challenge 31
| 
| align=center| 1
| align=center| 2:25
| Kenosha, Wisconsin, United States
| 
|-
| Win
| align=center| 18-5
| James Jones
| Decision (split)
| Bodog Fight: Alvarez vs. Lee
| 
| align=center| 3
| align=center| 5:00
| Trenton, New Jersey, United States
| 
|-
| Loss
| align=center| 17-5
| Ryan Bow
| Submission (guillotine choke)
| Bodog Fight: Costa Rica Combat
| 
| align=center| 2
| align=center| 0:14
| Costa Rica
| 
|-
| Loss
| align=center| 17-4
| Vladimir Zenin
| KO (punches)
| Bodog Fight: USA vs. Russia
| 
| align=center| 1
| align=center| 4:26
| Vancouver, British Columbia, Canada
| 
|-
| Win
| align=center| 17-3
| Nardu Debrah
| TKO (punches)
| Bodog Fight: To the Brink of War
| 
| align=center| 2
| align=center| N/A
| Costa Rica
| 
|-
| Win
| align=center| 16-3
| Joe Germain
| TKO (strikes)
| ECT: Eau Claire Throwdown
| 
| align=center| 1
| align=center| 0:00
| Eau Claire, Wisconsin, United States
| 
|-
| Win
| align=center| 15-3
| Matt Wiman
| Decision (Unanimous)
| MFC: Boardwalk Blitz
| 
| align=center| 3
| align=center| 5:00
| Atlantic City, New Jersey, United States
| 
|-
| Win
| align=center| 14-3
| Rob Marcks
| TKO (submission to punches)
| FCC 21: Freestyle Combat Challenge 21
| 
| align=center| 1
| align=center| N/A
| Racine, Wisconsin, United States
| 
|-
| Win
| align=center| 13-3
| Eiji Mitsuoka
| Decision (unanimous)
| GCM: D.O.G. 2
| 
| align=center| 3
| align=center| 5:00
| Tokyo, Japan
| 
|-
| Win
| align=center| 12-3
| Dave Lehr Cochran
| Submission (rear-naked choke)
| FCC 19: Freestyle Combat Challenge 19
| 
| align=center| 0
| align=center| 0:00
| Racine, Wisconsin, United States
| 
|-
| Loss
| align=center| 11-3
| Yves Edwards
| TKO (punches)
| UFC 45: Revolution
| 
| align=center| 2
| align=center| 2:14
| Uncasville, Connecticut, United States
| 
|-
| Win
| align=center| 11-2
| Joe Jordan
| TKO (corner stoppage)
| FCC 12: Freestyle Combat Challenge 12
| 
| align=center| 2
| align=center| 2:28
| Racine, Wisconsin, United States
| 
|-
| Win
| align=center| 10-2
| Edson Diniz
| Decision (unanimous)
| AFC 5: Absolute Fighting Championships 5
| 
| align=center| 3
| align=center| 5:00
| Fort Lauderdale, Florida, United States
| 
|-
| Win
| align=center| 9-2
| Cade Swallows
| TKO (doctor stoppage)
| HOOKnSHOOT: Absolute Fighting Championships 1
| 
| align=center| 1
| align=center| 4:32
| Fort Lauderdale, Florida, United States
| 
|-
| Win
| align=center| 8-2
| Darrell Smith
| Decision (unanimous)
| HOOKnSHOOT: New Wind
| 
| align=center| 2
| align=center| 5:00
| Evansville, Indiana, United States
| 
|-
| Win
| align=center| 7-2
| Steve Thompson
| TKO (submission to punches)
| IHC 4: Armageddon
| 
| align=center| 1
| align=center| 3:00
| Hammond, Indiana, United States
| 
|-
| Win
| align=center| 6-2
| Mike Blegin
| KO (punches)
| FCC 7: Freestyle Combat Challenge 7
| 
| align=center| 1
| align=center| 0:17
| Racine, Wisconsin, United States
| 
|-
| Win
| align=center| 5-2
| Rory Prazak
| TKO (submission to punches)
| FCC 6: Freestyle Combat Challenge 6
| 
| align=center| 1
| align=center| 0:16
| Racine, Wisconsin, United States
| 
|-
| Loss
| align=center| 4-2
| Charlie Pearson
| Decision (unanimous)
| WEC 2
| 
| align=center| 3
| align=center| 5:00
| Lemoore, California, United States
| 
|-
| Win
| align=center| 4-1
| Ray Benavides
| TKO (punches)
| WEC 1
| 
| align=center| 2
| align=center| 4:29
| Lemoore, California, United States
| 
|-
| Win
| align=center| 3-1
| Josh Lewandowski
| Decision (unanimous)
| FCC 4: Freestyle Combat Challenge 4
| 
| align=center| 1
| align=center| 10:00
| Racine, Wisconsin, United States
| 
|-
| Loss
| align=center| 2-1
| Henry Matamoros
| Submission (armbar)
| FCC 3: Freestyle Combat Challenge 3
| 
| align=center| 1
| align=center| 4:51
| 
| 
|-
| Win
| align=center| 2-0
| Josh Roster
| Submission (fatigue)
| IFF 3: The Tournaments
| 
| align=center| 1
| align=center| 4:12
| Iowa, United States
| 
|-
| Win
| align=center| 1-0
| Ken Davis
| Submission (armbar)
| MAC: Midwest Absolute Challenge
| 
| align=center| 1
| align=center| 3:29
| McHenry, Illinois, United States
|

See also
List of male mixed martial artists

References

External links
 
 

1979 births
American male mixed martial artists
Lightweight mixed martial artists
Living people
Ultimate Fighting Championship male fighters